Government Medical College, Mahasamund, established in 2022, is a full-fledged tertiary Government Medical college and hospital. It is located at Mahasamund, Chhattisgarh. The college imparts the degree of Bachelor of Medicine and Surgery (MBBS). The hospital associated with the college is one of the largest hospitals in the Mahasamund district. Yearly undergraduate student intake is 125 from the year 2022.

Courses
Government Medical College, Mahasamund undertakes education and training of 125 students MBBS courses.

Affiliated
The college is affiliated with Pt. Deendayal Upadhyay Memorial Health Sciences and Ayush University of Chhattisgarh and is recognized by the National Medical Commission.

References

Medical colleges in Chhattisgarh
Government universities and colleges in India
Educational institutions established in 2022
2022 establishments in India